Songola (Songoora), or North Binja, is a minor Bantu language of the Democratic Republic of the Congo, spoken by the Songora people.

References

Lega-Binja languages